Crimen de doble filo is a 1965 Spanish film.

Cast
Susana Campos as Laura
 Carlos Estrada as Andrés Salas
José María Prada as Don Sixto
Paul Eslheman as Claus Hans
Alfonso Rojas as Antonio - el afinador
José Marco as Inspector Vázquez
Emilio Rodríguez as Julio Cuétar
Héctor Quiroga as Músico de la orquesta
Luis Marín
Erasmo Pascual as  Conserje del teatro Eslava
Chiro Bermejo
Antonio Casas as Comisario Ignacio Ruiz
Ángel Chinarro
Manuel Granada
Manuel Guitián
Esteban R. Hernández
José María Labernié
Cristina Marco
Julián Marcos
Sergio Mendizábal
Paloma Pagés
Elena Santonja
Alfredo Ulecia
 Óscar Ulloa
Pilar Vela
Mariano Vidal Molina
Rosa Zumárraga

External links
 

1965 films
Spanish crime thriller films
1960s Spanish-language films
Argentine black-and-white films
1960s Spanish films